Svetly is a rural locality (a settlement) in Svetlozerskoye Rural Settlement of Kholmogorsky District, Arkhangelsk Oblast, Russia. The population was 1,163 as of 2010.

Geography 
The settlement Svetly is located in the east of the district of Kholmogorsky, near the Arkhangelsk - Karpogory railway line. The nearest settlement is the Siya (Pinezhsky). The settlement ends near the road "Zemtsovo - Syloga - Svetly".

About 1156 people live in the settlement according to the data as January 1, 2011.

There is a school, post office, ambulatory, savings bank, fire department, house of culture, church of the Venerable in the settlement.

Svetly is located 77 km southeast of Kholmogory (the district's administrative centre) by road.

References 

Rural localities in Kholmogorsky District